Scleroprocta is a genus of crane fly in the family Limoniidae.

Distribution
North America, Europe & Asia.

Species
S. acifurca Savchenko, 1979
S. apicalis (Alexander, 1911)
S. balcanica Stary, 1976
S. cinctifer (Alexander, 1919)
S. hexacantha (Alexander, 1970)
S. innocens (Osten Sacken, 1869)
S. krzeminskii Stary, 2008
S. latiprocta Savchenko, 1973
S. oosterbroeki Stary, 2008
S. pentagonalis (Loew, 1873)
S. slaviki Stary, 2008
S. sororcula (Zetterstedt, 1851)
S. tetonica (Alexander, 1945)

References

Limoniidae
Diptera of North America
Diptera of Asia
Diptera of Europe